The 2007 Division 1 was contested by 28 teams divided into two groups geographically. Assyriska FF and Qviding FIF won their respective groups, and were thereby promoted to Superettan for the 2008 season. Second place teams FC Väsby United and Ängelholms FF were also promoted after having each won their playoffs against teams from Superettan.

League tables

North

South

Young Player Teams of the Year

At the end of each Division 1 season an all-star game is played called "Morgondagens Stjärnor" (English: "The Stars Of Tomorrow"). The two teams playing against each other consist of the best young players from each of the two leagues.

References
Sweden - List of final tables (Clas Glenning)

Swedish Football Division 1 seasons
3
Sweden
Sweden